Lord Harris refers to George Harris, 4th Baron Harris (1851–1932), English cricketer and politician.

Lord Harris may also refer to:

 George Harris, 1st Baron Harris (1746–1829), British soldier
 William Harris, 2nd Baron Harris (1782–1845), British soldier and politician
 George Harris, 3rd Baron Harris (1810–1872), Governor of Trinidad and Madras
 Ralph Harris, Baron Harris of High Cross (1924–2006), British economist
 John Harris, Baron Harris of Greenwich (1930–2001), British political aide and politician for Labour and the Liberal Democrats
 Philip Harris, Baron Harris of Peckham (born 1942), British entrepreneur and politician for the Conservatives
 Toby Harris, Baron Harris of Haringey (born 1953), British politician for Labour

See also
 Baron Harris
 Lord Harries of Pentregarth
 Earl of Malmesbury, who is surnamed Harris
 Harris baronets, any of the four Baronetcies created for persons with the surname Harris